Sexsational is the debut album by Czech R&B singer Tom Malar.

Track listing

Personnel 
 Tom Malar – Vocals

References

External links
 Tom Malar — official web site.

2005 albums
Tom Malar albums